William Boice Langford (1887–1977) was a golf course designer and civil engineer from Austin, Illinois. He graduated from both Yale and Columbia University. During the golden age of golf design between the world wars, he produced many great golf courses primarily in the Midwest states. Langford’s work is reminiscent of golf course designers Seth Raynor, Charles Banks and Charles B. Macdonald. He died in Sarasota, Florida in 1977.

Along with Theodore Moreau, he produced over 200 golf courses. Some of the best include Minnehaha Country Club, in Sioux Falls, South Dakota, added in 2018 as a tournament stop for the PGA Champions tour, Martin County Golf Course in Stuart, Florida, Milburn Country Club in Overland Park, Kansas, Wakonda in Des Moines, Iowa, Harrison Hills in Attica, Indiana, Maxinkuckee in Culver, Indiana (played often by Roy, Pete and Alice Dye early in their careers), Ozaukee in Mequon, Wisconsin, Lawsonia in Green Lake, Wisconsin, and Happy Hollow in Omaha, Nebraska.

Courses Designed
The following is a (partial) list of other courses designed or remodeled by William Langford: 

 Arkansas
 Texarkana CC (1927) - Texarkana, AR
 Florida
 Key West GC (1923) - Key West, FL 
 Martin County GC (1920) - Stuart, FL
 Eglin Eagle Course (1927) - Niceville, FL
 Illinois
 Acacia CC (1917) - Indian Head Park, IL
 Barrington Hills CC (1946) - Barrington, IL 
 Bloomington CC (1917) - Bloomington, IL 
 Bryn Mawr GC (1921) - Lincolnwood, IL
 Butterfield CC (1922) - Oak Brook, IL 
 Franklin County CC (back 9) (1921)(West Frankfort, IL)
 Glen Oak CC (1922) - Glen Ellyn, IL
 Kankakee Elks Club (1926) - Saint Anne, IL
 La Grange CC (1924) - La Grange, IL
 Marquette Park GC (1917) - Chicago, IL
 Park Ridge CC (1949) - Park Ridge, IL
 Ridgemoor Country Club (1905) - Harwood Heights, IL
 Riverside Golf Club (1917) - North Riverside, IL
 Ruth Lake CC (1926) - Hinsdale, IL
 Schaumburg CC (1928) - Schaumburg, IL
St. Clair Country Club (1911) - [Belleville, IL]
 Winnetka GC (1917) - Winnetka, IL
 Indiana
 Innsbrook CC (1919) - Merrillville, IN
 Christiana Creek CC (1925 and 1945) - Elkhart, IN
 Culver Military Academy (1920) - Culver, IN
 Harrison Hills Country Club (1924) - Attica, IN (9 holes)
 Oakland City GC (1946) - Oakland City, IN
 Maxwelton GC (1929) - Syracuse, IN
 Fort Wayne CC (1916) - Fort Wayne, IN (9 holes)
 Iowa
 Ellis Park Muni (1949) - Cedar Rapids, IA
 Keokuk CC (1951) - Keokuk, IA
 Oneota CC (1921) - Decorah, IA
 Wakonda CC (1922) - Des Moines, IA
 Kansas
 Brookridge Country Club (1960) - Overland Park, KS 
 Milburn G&CC (1917) - Overland Park, KS
Kentucky
 Audubon CC (1921) - Louisville, KY
 Indian Hills CC (1956) - Bowling Green, KY
 Louisville CC (1921) - Louisville, KY
 Michigan
 Blythefield CC (1927) - Belmont, MI
 Country Club of Lansing (1919) - Lansing, MI
 Marquette G&CC (1927) - Marquette, MI
 Minnesota
 Mankato GC (1954) - Mankato, MN
 Southview CC (1960) - West St. Paul, MN
 Mississippi
 Clarksdale CC (1921) - Clarksdale, MS
 Nebraska
 Highland CC (1924) - Omaha, NE
 Omaha CC (1927) - Omaha, NE
 South Dakota
 Minnehaha Country Club (1922) - Sioux Falls, SD
 Ohio
 Clovernook Country Club (1921) - Cincinnati, OH
 Fairlawn Country Club (1918) - Akron, OH
 Portage Path Country Club (1918) - Akron, OH
 Tennessee
 Chickasaw CC (1922) - Memphis, TN
 Colonial CC (1916) - Cordova, TN
 Gatlinburg G&CC (1956) - Pigeon Forge, TN
 Green Meadow CC (1958) - Alcoa, TN
 The Country Club (1959) - Morristown, TN
 Wisconsin
 The Links at Lawsonia - Green Lake, WI
 Ozaukee CC (1922) - Mequon, WI
 Spring Valley CC (1927) - Salem, WI
 West Bend CC (1922) - West Bend, WI

References

Links
 http://thecaddyshack.blogspot.com/2007/06/architect-15-william-langford.html
 http://www.golfclubatlas.com/in-my-opinion/mark-chalfant-the-architecture-of-william-b-langford/
 https://webspace.yale.edu/Yale-golf-history/Eras/1895-1923/Langford.htm

Langford, William B.
Sportspeople from Illinois
1887 births
1977 deaths
Yale University alumni
Columbia University alumni